Danny Luis Flores Gonzales (born April 6, 2002) is an American soccer player who plays for Virginia Tech Hokies.

Career 
Flores appeared as an amateur player for USL Championship side Bethlehem Steel during their 2019 season, as well as being part of the Philadelphia Union academy.

On April 19, 2021, Flores returned to his native Northern California, joining Oakland Roots SC on a USL Academy contract.

References

External links 
 
 

2002 births
Living people
American soccer players
Association football midfielders
Oakland Roots SC players
Philadelphia Union II players
Soccer players from California
USL Championship players
Virginia Tech Hokies men's soccer players